Our Land is a political party in Ukraine, founded on 23 August 2011, under the name "Bloc Party". In 2014, it was renamed as "Our Land". In the October 2015 Ukrainian local elections the party was one of the winners. Our Land took third place with 4,375 seats and 156 seats as mayors, heads of towns and villages. In the 2020 Ukrainian local elections the party gained 1,694 seats.

History

The party was established/registered on 23 August 2011 as "Block Party".

The party did not participate in the 2012 Ukrainian parliamentary elections; or the 2014 Ukrainian parliamentary elections.

On 20 December 2014, the party changed its name to "Our Land".

By the summer of 2015 the majority of representatives of the party changed dramatically, encompassing individuals who still in 2014 were members of the Party of Regions. "Our Land" claimed in September 2015 that 62 mayors had joined the party, including the mayors of Mykolaiv, Chernihiv and Mariupol. Another known member of the party is member of the Ukrainian parliament (for Kharkiv) Oleksandr Feldman, who joined the party in August 2015.

In the 2019 Ukrainian parliamentary election, the party took part in only one single-mandate constituency. Its candidate Dmytro Khomiak received 0.10% of the vote in constituency 95 located in Irpin and was thus not elected to parliament.

In the 2020 Ukrainian local elections 1,694 Our Land candidates won seats on the local and regional level, about 5.13% of the total number of contested seats.

During the 2022 Russian invasion of Ukraine, many members of the Our Land party cooperated with the Russian Armed Forces. Basically, the collaboration with the Russian military was carried out by local self-government figures in the occupied territories.

Management
The party is headed by three party leaders, all of whom were members of the Party of Regions until 2014: Oleksandr Mazurchak, Anton Kisse, Andrii Derkach, and Serhii Shakhov.

Ideology and political positions
The party claims its main interest is "defense of the interests of local communities" and claims this is necessary because "the central government takes into account the interests of the community last". The public image of the party has three components: a team of experienced professionals, primarily local managers; disinterest in political games and ideological disputes; party core - regional centers focused on the development of their "small homelands".

Despite its roots from the pro-Russian Party of Regions, Our Land has supported Ukrainian military action against the 2022 Russian invasion of Ukraine.

Election results 
The party was one of the winners of the October 2015 Ukrainian local elections and took 4,640 seats. According to the Committee of Voters of Ukraine, Our Land became the most productive party in terms of the ratio of elected deputies to the number of registered candidates, gaining 32.3%. In July 2016, Serhiy Shakhov won the by-elections to the Verkhovna Rada in constituency No. 114 (Luhansk Oblast) with 37.62% result.

According to the results of the local elections of 2015–2019, the party entered the top five by the number of elected deputies.

In the first elections in the newly created united territorial communities, which took place in December 2016, 245 candidates became deputies from "Our Land".

On December 11, 89 representatives of the party from 15 OTGs became deputies. Leonid Dusha became the mayor of Baturyn in the Chernihiv Oblast, and Anatoliy Malakhatka became the chairman of the Malotokmach's village council in the Zaporizhzhia Oblast.

The party received 30% of the votes in the Mykolaiv and Chernihiv Oblasts (32%), and almost 20% in local elections in the Donetsk Oblast.

In the OTG elections on June 30, 2019, the party took second place with 17.2% of seats. 127 party representatives in 25 territorial communities became deputies.

In local elections up to 86 OTGs (69 rural, 16 settlement, 1 city), which took place on December 22, 2019, in 21 oblasts of Ukraine, as well as in additional local elections - in 33 OTGs (20 rural, 13 settlement) in 17 oblasts of Ukraine "Our Land" won 61 seats, which is 6.7% of all deputies elected from the parties, and took third place among the parties in the elections.

In the 2019 Ukrainian parliamentary election, three representatives of the party became People's Deputies of the Verkhovna Rada of Ukraine of the 9th convocation: Anton Kisse, Valeriy Davydenko, Serhii Shakhov and Andrii Derkach (In 2023, Volodymyr Zelensky announced that Andriy Derkach pinned the enormity of Ukraine. After that, the Verkhovna Rada voted for allowing the deputy mandate). Davydenko was found shot dead in the bathroom of his office on 23 May 2020.

See also
 Party of Regions (Opposition Bloc and Revival (Ukraine))

References

External links
 Official website 

 
Political parties in Ukraine
Political parties established in 2011